North Hill is the second highest point of the range of Malvern Hills that runs about  north-south along the Herefordshire-Worcestershire border, although North Hill lies entirely within Worcestershire.

The eastern flank of the hill lies directly behind Worcester road in Great Malvern from where its summit is a brisk 15 – 20 minutes steep walk from the town centre via St Ann's road and Happy Valley. A path from the car park in North Malvern follows the lower contour of North Hill to Happy Valley and St. Ann's Well.

History 

Although the flint route from North Wales to Wessex lay to the north of Malvern, there is some evidence to suggest that traders passed over the Malvern Hills. Parts of an arrowhead, scraper and flint flakes have been discovered between the North Hill and Table Hill. A 19th-century guide book describes both a collapsed burial mound on North Hill named the Giant's Grave and a tump on  Table Hill. These tumuli may have been connected to the Dobunni settlement in Mathon.

A track that runs along North Hill was known as the "Pyx Path" and was used by the priest from Worcestershire when bringing Sacrament to the hermits that lived in Malvern in the 11th Century.  It was also referred to as the "Pixie Path", as it was believed to be used by fairies. The Lodge spring can be found at the foot of North Hill, off Worcester road. The ornamental fountain has a small spout and basin that is similar in design to those at St Ann's Well.

Folklore

In Early British Trackways, Moats, Mounds, Camps, and Sites Alfred Watkins theorised that North Hill was the beginning of a ley line to Pen-y-Beacon via Mathon Church, Moat at Birchend, Stretton Grandison Church, Shucknell Hill, White Stone Chapel, Burcot Pool, Ten Houses Pond and Sugwas Park.

The Worcestershire Way

The route and its length were modified in 2004 and it now runs wholly within Worcestershire. The last few miles of the Way now ascend to the northern part of the Malvern Hills and skirt around the contours of End Hill, Table Hill and along Lady Howard de Walden's Drive on North Hill, before descending to Great Malvern via St Ann's Well.

References

External links
 Panoramic view from North Hill
 Panoramic view of the North Malvern Clock Tower
 Walks on the Northern Hills

Marilyns of England
Hills of Worcestershire
Malvern Hills
Malvern, Worcestershire